Togbe Osei III (born 18 August 1966) is the Togbe of Godenu.

Life

Togbe Osei III was born on August 18, 1966.
He attended and formed some of Ghana's top schools before taking the National Service Exam.

Togbe working career started at Ghanaian Education Service, a national authority for education, and continued his distinguished career in the Ghana Police Service.
After serving in the police force, Togbe was called as a security consultant to various government institutions.
On June 29, 2002, he was appointed as traditional ruler, or Togbe, of Godenu succeeding his grandfather and following a line of birthright of the Gadagoe family.

Since 2009, he has held a prominent position at the Ministry of Justice in Ghana, a department within the Judicial Service of Ghana.

Engagement
Togbe Osei III is committed to serving the people of Godenu. For some years he has built schools in his region and initiated many humanitarian projects in cooperation with various NGOs from across the globe.

He was appointed Grand Prior of the Grand Priory of Ghana of the Hospitaller Order of St. Lazarus of Jerusalem. He is also known for inviting his colleagues, other traditional sub-national leaders, to work together for the  development of their respective regions. 
This work is part of Gbi Dukor, an organization that exists to protect the cultures of these traditional areas and  promote development throughout the region.

Awards
Selection of the most important orders and awards:
  Grandmaster, Royal Order of the Elephant of Godenu
  Grandmaster, Royal Order of the Lion of Godenu
  Grand Cross, Royal and Hashemite Order of the Pearl (Sulu, Philippines)
  Medal of Honor (Special Class), Association of Monarchic Autarchs (Portugal)
  Grand Cross Royal and Dynastic Order of the Eagle of Hohoe
   Grand Cross IG FVT

References

External links
 Royal House of Godenu

Living people
1966 births
Ghanaian royalty